TVS may refer to:

Mathematics 
 Topological vector space

Television 
 Television Sydney, TV channel in Sydney, Australia
 Television South, ITV franchise holder in the South of England between 1982 and 1992
 TVS Television Network, US distributor of live programming (mostly sports), in the 1960s and 1970s
 TVS (Poland), a regional Silesia commercial DVB-T free-to-air television station
 TVS (Russia), a defunct Russian television channel
 TVS China, also known as Southern Television Guangdong, a regional television network
 TVS (Venezuela), Venezuelan regional television channel based in the city of Maracay
 Former name of the Brazilian channel now known as Sistema Brasileiro de Televisão
 Television Saitama, Japan
 TVS (São Tomé and Príncipe), the public television broadcaster of São Tomé and Príncipe
 TVS (TV Sarawak), TV channel in Malaysia

Other 
 T. V. Sundram, Indian industrialist
 TVS Group, an industrial conglomerate based in India
 TVS Electronics, computer peripherals manufacturing company
 TVS Motor, motor manufacturing company
 IATA code for Tangshan Sannühe Airport
 Transvaginal ultrasound
 Transient voltage suppressor, an electronic component used for surge protection
 Triggered vacuum switch, a type of krytron
 Trinity Valley School, a private school in Ft. Worth, Texas
 The Virgin Suicides, a 1993 novel
 Tornado vortex signature
 T. V. Sankaranarayanan, Indian singer